Brian Tracey is a New Zealand former professional rugby league footballer who represented New Zealand in the 1972 World Cup.

Playing career
Tracey played for the Ponsonby club in the Auckland Rugby League competition.

In 1972, Tracey was selected in the New Zealand national rugby league team squad for the World Cup and went on to play in all three matches at the tournament.

In 1973 Tracey was part of the Auckland side that won the national Rothmans trophy.

Coaching career
Tracey later coached the Te Atatu Roosters in the Auckland Rugby League competition, sharing the Hyland Memorial Cup as best coach with Mount Albert's Mike McLennan in 1984 and winning it outright in 1986.

References

Living people
New Zealand rugby league players
New Zealand national rugby league team players
Auckland rugby league team players
Rugby league halfbacks
Ponsonby Ponies players
Te Atatu Roosters coaches
New Zealand rugby league coaches
Year of birth missing (living people)